Streptomyces flaveolus is a bacterium species from the genus of Streptomyces which has been isolated from soil. Streptomyces flaveolus produces L-isoleucine, actinomycin J and tirandamycin.

See also 
 List of Streptomyces species

References

Further reading

External links
Type strain of Streptomyces flaveolus at BacDive -  the Bacterial Diversity Metadatabase

flaveolus
Bacteria described in 1948